Sar Chenar (also Romanized as Sar Chenār) is a village in Chenar Rural District, Kabgian District, Dana County, Kohgiluyeh and Boyer-Ahmad Province, Iran. At the 2006 census, its population was 62, in 11 families.

References 

Populated places in Dana County